Kerstin Månsson (born 31 August 1960) is a Swedish orienteering competitor. She is two times Relay World Champion as a member of the Swedish winning team in 1983 and 1985.

References

1960 births
Living people
Swedish orienteers
Female orienteers
Foot orienteers
World Orienteering Championships medalists